Sarah Anne Williams is an American voice actress. She currently resides in Los Angeles. In anime, she is known for her performances as Nonon Jakuzure in  Kill la Kill, Sayaka Miki in Puella Magi Madoka Magica, Lisbeth in Sword Art Online, Neferpitou in Hunter × Hunter, Felix Argyle in Re:Zero − Starting Life in Another World, Karin Miyoshi in Yuki Yuna is a Hero, Yuniko Kozuki in Accel World, E.M. Pino in Edens Zero, and Susamaru in Demon Slayer: Kimetsu no Yaiba. In video games, she voiced Jinx in League of Legends, Uni / Black Sister in the Hyperdimension Neptunia series, Echo in Mobius Final Fantasy, Jack Frost in Shin Megami Tensei IV: Apocalypse, Chihaya Mifune in Persona 5, Peacock in Skullgirls, and Mist in Fire Emblem Heroes.

Filmography

Anime

Animation

Film

Video games

References

External links 

Living people
American voice actresses
American video game actresses
Actresses from Indiana
Year of birth missing (living people)
21st-century American actresses